Sinoxylon is a genus of beetle native to Europe, the Afro-tropical region, the Australian region, the Near East, the Nearctic, the Neotropical region, North Africa and the Oriental region.

External links
Sinoxylon at Fauna Europaea

Bostrichidae